George Charles is a Saint Lucian politician.

George Charles may also refer to:

George Charles of Hesse-Kassel (1691–1755)
George Frederick Charles, Margrave of Brandenburg-Bayreuth (1688–1735), German prince

See also
Charles George (disambiguation)